Mürsəlli or Myursali or Myursalli or Myursally may refer to:
Mürsəlli, Imishli, Azerbaijan
Mürsəlli, Sabirabad, Azerbaijan
 Mursallı, Aydın, Turkey